The 1878 Oxfordshire by-election was fought on 5 February 1878.  The byelection was fought due to the resignation of the incumbent Conservative MP, Joseph Warner Henley.  It was won by the unopposed Conservative candidate Edward William Harcourt.

References

1878 in England
1878 elections in the United Kingdom
By-elections to the Parliament of the United Kingdom in Oxfordshire constituencies
19th century in Oxfordshire
Unopposed by-elections to the Parliament of the United Kingdom in English constituencies